The 2013 Barcelona Open Banco Sabadell (also known as the Torneo Godó) was a men's tennis tournament played on outdoor clay courts. It was the 61st edition of the event and it was part of the ATP World Tour 500 series of the 2013 ATP World Tour. It took place at the Real Club de Tenis Barcelona in Barcelona, Catalonia, Spain, from 20 April through 28 April 2013.  Rafael Nadal  won his record 8th title at the tournament.

Points and prize money

Points distribution

Prize money

Singles main draw entrants

Seeds

1 Rankings as of 15 April 2013.

Other entrants
The following players received wildcards into the main draw:
  Roberto Carballés Baena
  Pablo Carreño Busta
  Gerard Granollers
  Albert Montañés

The following players received entry from the qualifying draw:
  Kenny de Schepper
  Ernests Gulbis
  Jan Hájek
  Marc López
  Guillermo Olaso
  Dmitry Tursunov

The following player received entry as a lucky loser:
  Jan-Lennard Struff

Withdrawals
Before the tournament
  Roberto Bautista Agut
  Richard Gasquet
  Feliciano López
  Leonardo Mayer
During the tournament
  Thomaz Bellucci (abdominal injury)

Doubles main draw entrants

Seeds

 Rankings are as of 15 April 2013.

Other entrants
The following pairs received wildcards into the doubles main draw:
  Gerard Granollers /  Albert Montañés
  Albert Ramos /  Tommy Robredo
The following pair received entry as alternates:
  Nikolay Davydenko /  Denis Istomin

Withdrawals
  Mike Bryan (wrist injury)

Champions

Singles

 Rafael Nadal defeated  Nicolás Almagro 6–4, 6–3

Doubles

 Alexander Peya /  Bruno Soares defeated  Robert Lindstedt /  Daniel Nestor 5–7, 7–6(9–7), [10–4]

References

External links
Official Website

Barcelona Open Banc Sabadell
Barcelona Open (tennis)
Barcelona Open Banco Sabadell